Yuraq Urqu (Quechua yuraq white, urqu mountain, "white mountain", also spelled Yuracc Orcco) is a  mountain in the Andes of Peru. It is situated in the Ayacucho Region, Huanca Sancos Province, Lucanamarca District.Yuraq Urqu lies southeast of Yanawaqra.

References

Mountains of Peru
Mountains of Ayacucho Region